Douglas Junior dos Reis (born 9 December 1995) is a Brazilian athlete specialising in the discus throw. He has won several medals at regional level.

His personal best in the event is 59.90 metres set in São Bernardo do Campo in 2017.

International competitions

References

1995 births
Living people
Brazilian male discus throwers
Athletes (track and field) at the 2018 South American Games
Competitors at the 2017 Summer Universiade